Vandit Records is a German record label founded in 1999 by Paul van Dyk. Its first release was van Dyk's own tracks "Another Way" and "Avenue". The Berlin-based record label is largely focused on trance and progressive house.  The label has been known for hosting large concert parties in Berlin.

In 2013 they signed a digital distribution and video deal with Believe Digital. In May 2015, the label celebrated their 15th anniversary with the digital release The Best of VANDIT and an associated club tour.

Current artists
Adam Donohoe-McLean 
Antony Henderson
Apple One
Alex M.O.R.P.H
Allen & Envy
Arman Dinarvand
Ben Nicky
Bryan Kearney
CBM
David Forbes
Eddie Bitar
Enoh
Filo & Peri
FKN
Genix
Heatbeat
Giuseppe Ottaviani
Jardin
Interstate
Jordan Suckley
Jon O'Bir
Judge Jules
Las Salinas
Living Stone Rhys
Logan Gilmour MSYP
Maarten de Jong
Mark Burton
Martin Roth
Mohamed Bahi
MOTi
Omar Taher
Orla Feeney
Rafael Osmo
SHato & Paul Rockseek
Strobe
Tangle
The Thrillseekers
Tom Colontonio
Tristan D
Will Atkinson

See also
 List of record labels

References

External links
 

German independent record labels
Trance record labels
House music record labels
Techno record labels
IFPI members
Record labels established in 1999
1999 establishments in Germany